United Plantations Berhad is a Malaysia-based oil palm plantation company.

History 
United Plantations Limited was founded in 1917 through the amalgamation of several existing plantations. The company was listed on the Copenhagen Stock Exchange on February 28, 1932. In 1962, United Plantations Ltd. was merged with Bernam Oil Palms Ltd. under the present name, United Plantations Berhad, which was then listed on the Kuala Lumpur Stock Exchange in 1969.

Present Operations 
Across their various estates in Malaysia and Indonesia United Plantations had 45,810 hectares of oil palm planted as of their 2013 annual report. An additional 3,090 hectares in Malaysia was planted with coconut.

Notes 

1917 establishments in British Malaya
Agriculture companies of Malaysia
Palm oil production in Malaysia
Palm oil production in Indonesia
Companies listed on Bursa Malaysia
Agriculture companies established in 1917